Group 3 of the 1950 FIFA World Cup took place from 25 June to 2 July 1950. The group consisted of Sweden, Italy, Paraguay, and India. However, India later withdrew from the group. The group winners advanced to the final round.

Standings

 was also drawn into this group, but withdrew before playing.

Matches
All times listed are local time.

Sweden vs Italy

Sweden vs Paraguay

Italy vs Paraguay

References

External links
 1950 FIFA World Cup archive

1950 FIFA World Cup
Italy at the 1950 FIFA World Cup
Sweden at the 1950 FIFA World Cup
Paraguay at the 1950 FIFA World Cup